Ahmed Ahmed Mahmud Ragab (born 29 September 1991) is an Egyptian competitive sailor. He competed at the 2016 Summer Olympics in Rio de Janeiro, finishing 43rd in the men's Laser class.

References

External links
 
 

1991 births
Living people
Egyptian male sailors (sport)
Olympic sailors of Egypt
Sailors at the 2016 Summer Olympics – Laser